Copestylum victoria, or Victoria's bromeliad fly, is a species of syrphid fly in the family Syrphidae.

References

Eristalinae
Articles created by Qbugbot
Taxa named by Samuel Wendell Williston
Insects described in 1887